Edward Henry Butler Vaizey, Baron Vaizey of Didcot,  (born 5 June 1968) is a British politician, media columnist, political commentator and barrister who was Minister for Culture, Communications and Creative Industries from 2010 to 2016. A member of the Conservative Party, he  was Member of Parliament (MP) for Wantage from 2005 to 2019.

Early life
Vaizey was born in June 1968 in St Pancras, London. He is the son of the late John Vaizey, a Labour life peer, and the art historian Marina Vaizey (The Lady Vaizey CBE). His father's family is from South London. He spent part of his childhood in Berkshire. He was educated at St Paul's School, London before reading history at Merton College, Oxford. Elected Librarian of the Oxford Union, he graduated with an upper second class degree. After leaving university, Vaizey worked for the Conservative MPs Kenneth Clarke and Michael Howard as an adviser on employment and education issues. He practised as a barrister for several years, in family law and child care.

Political career
Vaizey first stood for Parliament at the 1997 general election, when he was the Conservative Party candidate for Bristol East. In the 2001 general election, he acted as an election aide to Iain Duncan Smith. He unsuccessfully stood at the 2002 local elections for the safe Labour ward of Harrow Road (based around the area of that name) in the City of Westminster.

He is regarded as a moderniser within the Conservative Party, contributing in both policy and image terms. He was a speechwriter for Michael Howard, Leader of the Conservative Party until December 2004, and editor of the Blue Books series which looked into new approaches to Conservative policy in areas such as health and transport.

Vaizey was one of Michael Howard's inner circle of advisers and a member of a group of Young Conservatives somewhat disparagingly referred to as the "Notting Hill Set" along with David Cameron—elected party leader in December 2005—George Osborne, Michael Gove, Nicholas Boles and Rachel Whetstone. Like Gove and Boles, he is a fellow of the Henry Jackson Society, and also a vice-chairman of Conservative Friends of Poland.

Member of Parliament
In 2002, Vaizey was selected by Wantage Conservative Association to be its candidate for the 2005 general election to succeed the sitting MP, Robert Jackson, who subsequently crossed the floor to Labour. Vaizey won a two-thirds majority in the final ballot of members and was elected as MP in that election, receiving 22,394 votes. His majority was 8,017 over the Liberal Democrats; this represented 43% of the voters and a 1.9% swing from the Liberal Democrats to the Conservatives.

When first elected to the House of Commons, Vaizey became a member of the Standing Committee on the Consumer Credit Bill. Before being appointed to the Opposition frontbench he was a member of the Modernisation and Environmental Audit Select Committees and was Deputy Chairman of the Conservative's Globalisation and Global Poverty Policy Group.

In November 2006, Vaizey was appointed to the Conservative frontbench as a Shadow Minister for Culture, overseeing Arts and Broadcasting policy.

In the 2010 general election he received a vote of 29,284, which was 52% of the votes cast, winning an increased majority of 13,457. While the Conservative Party was in negotiations with the Lib Dems in the days after 6 May 2010, Vaizey was appearing regularly on television putting forward the Conservative viewpoint. In the 2015 general election Vaizey increased his majority to 21,749. In the 2017 general election Vaizey's majority was reduced but his share of the vote increased to 54.2%.

Vaizey was one of the group of 21 MPs who had the Conservative Whip removed in September 2019, sitting as an independent politician until having the whip restored on 29 October 2019. On 6 November 2019 Vaizey announced his decision not to stand for re-election in the 2019 general election.

Ministerial career 

In 2010, Vaizey was appointed as Minister for Culture, Communications and Creative Industries. with responsibilities in the Departments for Culture, Media and Sport and for Business, Innovation and Skills. Vaizey was the longest serving Minister of Culture since the post was created in 1964, serving a total of 2,255 days, exceeding the total set by the first incumbent, Jennie Lee, by 186 days.

Upon leaving office, over 150 senior figures from the arts and creative industries wrote to the Daily Telegraph to express their thanks for his service as Minister for Culture and the Digital Economy. In 2011 he was mistakenly informed that he was to be Trade Minister, a post actually intended for Ed Davey.

Vaizey supported continued membership of the European Union in the 2016 referendum and is supportive of the European Atomic Energy Community (Euratom).

As a minister, Vaizey upheld the policy of free entry to the UK's national museums.  Towards the end of his tenure, the Treasury introduced tax credits for theatre, orchestras and museums.  Vaizey also secured £150 million in capital funding from the Treasury to help reform museum storage.

He oversaw the separation of English Heritage into two arms – a regulator, now known as Historic England, and a charity, English Heritage.  Vaizey also held responsibility for the creative industries and ensured the continuance of the film tax credits, as well as the introduction of tax credits for video games, television and visual effects.  As a result, the film industry became the second highest contributor to growth in the service sector in 2017, growing by 72.4% since 2014, compared to European growth of 8.5%.  During his tenure, the creative industries grew at three times the rate of the UK economy as a whole. He was dismissed as a minister by Theresa May on 14 July 2016, and returned to the backbenches. He was appointed a member of the Privy Council in July 2016.

Expenses claims

On 18 May 2009, The Daily Telegraph reported that receipts submitted by Vaizey show that he ordered a £467 sofa, a £544 chair, a £280.50 low table and a £671 table in February 2007 from Oka, a furniture shop run by Annabel Astor. The Commons Fees Office initially rejected the claim as the receipt said that the furniture was due to be delivered to Vaizey's home address in West London, but was later paid when Vaizey advised the Fees Office that the furniture was intended for his second home at his Wantage constituency. Vaizey told The Daily Telegraph that he and his wife "had it delivered to London because we would be in to collect it and we were driving down with it".

When these claims became public, Vaizey said that he had repaid the cost of the Oka furniture and the antique chair which he had bought with taxpayers' money: "I accept that the £300 armchair was an antique item and therefore that claim should not have been made. I also accept that the Oka items could be deemed as being of higher quality than necessary. I have paid back both these claims. I have not claimed for any other furniture bought for my constituency home at any time before or since." Vaizey has described himself as "relatively affluent".

In November 2011, it was further reported that Vaizey had submitted expenses claims of 8p for a 350-yard car journey and 16p for a 700-yard journey.

Peerage 
It was announced on 31 July 2020 that Vaizey was to be raised to the peerage in the 2019 Dissolution Honours. He was created Baron Vaizey of Didcot, of Wantage in the County of Oxfordshire in the afternoon of 1 September.

He made his maiden speech in the House of Lords on 21 September 2020.

Media career
Vaizey has been a regular commentator for the Conservative Party in the broadcast and news media. He wrote regular comment pieces for The Guardian between 1998 and 2005 and has contributed articles to The Sunday Times, The Times and The Daily Telegraph. He briefly wrote editorials for the Evening Standard. Vaizey is also a regular broadcaster, having appeared on Fi Glover's and Edwina Currie's shows on BBC Radio 5 Live, as a regular panelist on Channel 5's The Wright Stuff, BBC Radio 4's Despatch Box and Westminster Hour, and occasionally presented People and Politics on the BBC World Service.

On 24 September 2010, Vaizey was named tenth in the 2010 Guardian Film Power 100 list. He played a cameo role as an Oxfordshire MP in the 2012 film Tortoise in Love.

Other work
Subsequent to leaving office as Minister for Culture, Communications and Creative Industries, Vaizey became a trustee of the National Youth Theatre and the international charity BritDoc, which supports long-form documentary making, both of which roles are unpaid. Vaizey is also a trustee of London Music Masters, a charity which provides children from disadvantaged backgrounds access to a high quality music education.

He was appointed the unpaid chairman of Creative Fuse NE, a programme overseen by five universities in North East England to look at the importance of fusing creativity and technology.

Vaizey took a role with LionTree Advisors who paid a salary of £50,000 for one day's work per week. The Advisory Committee on Business Appointments approved his application to work for the investment bank, which specialises in media and technology mergers and acquisitions, despite Vaizey's having met the firm on "official business" three times in his final months as minister.

He is president of the Old Pauline Club, the alumni association of St Paul's School which he attended as a boy.

Bibliography
A Blue Tomorrow – New Visions for Modern Conservatives (2001) (ed. with Michael Gove and Nicholas Boles). 
Blue Book on Health: Conservative Visions for Health Policy (2002) 
Blue Book on Transport: Conservative Visions for Transport Policy (ed with Michael McManus) (2002) 
Blue Book on Education (ed with Michael McManus) (2003)

Arms

Notes

References

External links
Official website
Profile at the Conservative Party
Wantage and Didcot Conservatives

 Video game industry interview with Ed Vaizey, Bruceongames, 27 July 2009
Art interview with Ed Vaizey, Artforums.co.uk, 15 December 2009

1968 births
Alumni of Merton College, Oxford
British male journalists
British special advisers
Conservative Party (UK) life peers
Conservative Party (UK) MPs for English constituencies
Independent members of the House of Commons of the United Kingdom
English barristers
English people of American descent
English people of Jewish descent
Government ministers of the United Kingdom
Living people
Members of the Middle Temple
Members of the Privy Council of the United Kingdom
People from Berkshire
People from Wantage
People from Essex
People educated at Colet Court
People educated at St Paul's School, London
The Guardian journalists
The Sunday Times people
The Times people
UK MPs 2005–2010
UK MPs 2010–2015
UK MPs 2015–2017
UK MPs 2017–2019
Life peers created by Elizabeth II
Sons of life peers
Vaizey